Petr Blažek (born 30 March 1961) is a Czech modern pentathlete. He competed at the 1992 Summer Olympics.

References

External links
 

1961 births
Living people
Czech male modern pentathletes
Olympic modern pentathletes of Czechoslovakia
Czechoslovak male modern pentathletes
Modern pentathletes at the 1992 Summer Olympics
Sportspeople from Prague